Una Atrevida aventurita is a 1948 Argentine film directed by Carlos Hugo Christensen and written by Julio Porter.

Cast
Carlos Bellucci
Beba Bidart
Angel Boffa
Max Citelli
Miguel Coiro
Roberto Escalada
Susana Freyre
Ramón Garay
Miguel Gómez Bao
Tito Gómez
Diego Martínez
Felisa Mary
Julio Renato
Marcelo Ruggero
Marino Seré
Oscar Villa
Ernesto Villegas
Ángel Walk

External links
 

1948 films
1940s Spanish-language films
Argentine black-and-white films
Films directed by Carlos Hugo Christensen
1940s Argentine films